Piako was a New Zealand parliamentary electorate established in 1946 and disestablished in 2008. It was last held by Lindsay Tisch MP from 2002 to 2008.

Population centres
The 1941 New Zealand census had been postponed due to World War II, so the 1946 electoral redistribution had to take ten years of population growth and movements into account. The North Island gained a further two electorates from the South Island due to faster population growth. The abolition of the country quota through the Electoral Amendment Act, 1945 reduced the number and increased the size of rural electorates. None of the existing electorates remained unchanged, 27 electorates were abolished, eight former electorates were re-established, and 19 electorates were created for the first time, including Piako.

There was no adjustments in the number of electorates between the South and North Islands, but the law changes resulted in boundary adjustments to almost every electorate through the 1952 electoral redistribution; only five electorates were unaltered. Five electorates were reconstituted and one was newly created, and a corresponding six electorates were abolished (including Piako); all of these in the North Island.

After years of political tension, the National Government came to an agreement with the Labour Party on the redistribution provisions of the electoral law. This resulted in the 1956 Electoral Act, which significantly changed the composition of the Representation Commission; since then, there has been one member representing the government, and one the opposition, apart from all the official members. Tolerance to the electoral quota was reduced again to 5%. Combined with significant population redistributions within the islands, the boundaries of all but two electorates were altered.

The electorate included the population centres of Matamata, Cambridge, Morrinsville, Te Aroha, Waharoa, Waitoa, Huntly, Ngāruawāhia, and Ohaupo.

History
Piako was a rural Waikato electorate from 1946 to 1954, then from 1957 to 1978, when it was renamed .

Piako and its predecessors have always been considered safe National electorates. The Piako electorate was held by Jack Luxton from 1966 to 1978, when he transferred to the Matamata electorate.

Tisch served until the electorate was abolished in 2008, and transferred to the Waikato electorate.

Members of Parliament
Key

List MPs
Members of Parliament elected from party lists in elections where that person also unsuccessfully contested the Piako electorate. Unless otherwise stated, all MPs' terms began and ended at general elections.

Key

Election results

1975 election

Notes

References

External links
Electorate Profile  Parliamentary Library

Historical electorates of New Zealand
Geography of Waikato
1946 establishments in New Zealand
1954 disestablishments in New Zealand
1978 disestablishments in New Zealand
2008 disestablishments in New Zealand
1957 establishments in New Zealand
2002 establishments in New Zealand